Michael Ostrowski is an American television producer and screenwriter, best known for his work on serial drama Jericho and CSI spin-off CSI: Miami, both of which he has worked on as a producer and screenwriter. He currently serves as co-executive producer on NBC's The Blacklist.

As a producer, he has worked on the series Jericho, E-Ring and CSI: Miami, serving as supervising producer, producer and co-producer respectively. His writing credits are again for CSI: Miami and Jericho, and also for Private Practice and The District.

References

External links

American television producers
American television writers
American male screenwriters
Year of birth missing (living people)
Living people
American male television writers